The 2007 Nigerian Senate election in Jigawa State was held on 21 April 2007, to elect members of the Nigerian Senate to represent Jigawa State. Abdulaziz Usman representing Jigawa North-East, Ibrahim Saminu Turaki representing Jigawa North-West and Mujitaba Mohammed Mallam representing Jigawa South-West all won on the platform of the People's Democratic Party.

Overview

Summary

Results

Jigawa North-East 
The election was won by Abdulaziz Usman of the Peoples Democratic Party (Nigeria).

Jigawa North-West 
The election was won by Ibrahim Saminu Turaki of the Peoples Democratic Party (Nigeria).

Jigawa South-West 
The election was won by Mujitaba Mohammed Mallam of the Peoples Democratic Party (Nigeria).

References 

April 2007 events in Nigeria
Jigawa State Senate elections
Jig